John Buchanan (born 19 September 1951) is a Scottish former professional footballer and manager. During his career he played for Ross County, Northampton Town and Cardiff City, developing a reputation as a goalscoring midfielder.

Career 

Buchanan was playing in the Highland Football League for Ross County when he joined Northampton Town in 1970. He soon established himself in the first team and eventually moved to Cardiff City in October 1974 in exchange for John Farrington, making his debut in a 3–2 victory over York City. Cardiff were relegated in his first year at the club but bounced back up to the division the following season. Despite Buchanan being a midfielder he topped the club's scoring charts in two of his seven seasons with his impressive scoring record, his highest being a total of sixteen during the 1978–79 season including his only hattrick for Cardiff, during a 4–0 win over Sheffield United.

During his time at Cardiff, Buchanan was once arrested during a match. After watching Cardiff players Keith Pontin and Phil Dwyer receive red cards in the same incident Buchanan, himself suspended and watching the match from the stands, attempted to get on the pitch to voice his opinion to the referee only to be confronted by police. He left Ninian Park in 1981 to return to Northampton where he finished his career.

Buchanan later returned to the Highland League with Ross County as manager followed by a spell with Highland League neighbours, Brora Rangers  Before playing football professionally he played shinty for Caberfeidh.

After retirement

Buchanan currently works as a butcher in his hometown Dingwall.

Honours
Cardiff City

Welsh Cup runner-up: 1974–75, 1976–77
Football League Third Division runner-up: 1975–76

References

1951 births
Living people
Scottish footballers
Scottish football managers
Ross County F.C. players
Northampton Town F.C. players
Cardiff City F.C. players
English Football League players
Ross County F.C. managers
People from Dingwall
Shinty players
Sportspeople from Highland (council area)
Association football midfielders
Highland Football League managers